Llorar (English: "Cry") may refer to:

 "Llorar", a song by Aventura, from their album Love & Hate (2003)
 "Llorar", a song by Jesse & Joy featuring Mario Domm, from the deluxe edition of their album ¿Con Quién Se Queda El Perro? (2012)
 "Llorar", a song by Lucero, from her album Lucero De México (1992)

See also
 "Llorarás", a song by R.K.M & Ken-Y